Richard Beresford Poore OAM (born 22 July 1965) in Christchurch, New Zealand, and his wife Gilana, (an Australian citizen), were awarded OAMs For service to Australia by providing assistance to the victims of the bombings which occurred in Bali on 12 October 2002, and to their families.

He is the son of Matt Poore, who played test cricket for New Zealand in the 1950s.

References
https://honours.pmc.gov.au/honours/awards/1129383

External links
 Aussie award for Kiwi Bali bombing helper – 27 Aug 2005 – NZ Herald: New Zealand National news
 New Zealand Team helps local Bali victims ''New Zealand Herald, 29 Oct 2002   
 Tragedy for those who value peace, beauty – 13 October 2004 – The Age

1965 births
Living people
Recipients of the Medal of the Order of Australia
People from Christchurch